The Blue Mosque is a historic mosque in Tabriz, Iran. The mosque and some other public buildings were constructed in 1465 upon the order of Jahan Shah, the ruler of Kara Koyunlu.

The mosque was severely damaged in an earthquake in 1780, leaving only the iwan (entrance hall). Reconstruction began in 1973 by Reza Memaran Benam under the supervision of Iranian Ministry of Culture. However, it is still incomplete.

History

The Blue mosque of Tabriz was built upon the order of Jahan Shah, the ruler of the Kara Koyunlu. Jahan Shah's wife, Khatun Jan Begum (died 1469), established the endowment (vaqf) for the mosque's construction. However, just a few years later, Jahan Shah and his Kara Koyunlu were toppled by Uzun Hassan of the Ak Koyunlu, and Tabriz was taken. Jahan Shah's daughter, Saleha Khatun, oversaw the rest of the construction work by the new rulers. During the reign of Yaqub bin Uzun Hasan, "the cupola of the mosque's mausoleum as well as its main parts were completed". Sandra Aube adds: "A few details from the mausoleum’s interior, such as alabaster pieces from the wall panels and the main prayer niche (meḥrāb), reveal that the mausoleum was never completely finished  (Golombek and Wilber, p. 407; Aube, p. 248)".

Though the mausoleum was never completed, when the Safavids assumed control over Tabriz and made it their capital, the Blue Mosque itself served the new rulers as a mosque during the first half of the 16th century. In 1514, after the Safavids were defeated at the decisive Battle of Chaldiran, the Ottomans occupied and looted Tabriz, including the Blue Mosque. Aube notes that at least eight carpets were looted by the Turks and taken to Istanbul. Aube notes that even though it is not known whether the Turks attacked the structure itself during the capture and occupation of the Blue Mosque, several earthquakes did damage the building between the 16th and 18th centuries. It was especially severely damaged by the earthquake of 1780. However, in the 17th century, the Blue Mosque was already reportedly "completely destroyed and abandoned". In the 19th century, the local people of Tabriz looted the building's ruins. In the 20th century, during the Pahlavi era, the mosque was finally rebuilt. Reconstruction is performed by plans and supervision of Mohammad Reza Memaran Benam, a traditional architect from Tabriz, with authority of the Iranian Organization of Cultural Heritages.

Calligraphy
The diverse Kufic, and Thuluth scripts, the arabesque patterns, and the choramatic compositions of these facades, were created by Nematollah-ben-Mohammad-ol-Bavab, the famous calligrapher. The walls inside and outside had been covered with mosaic tiles.

Photo gallery

See also
 List of Mosques in Iran
 Khaqani Park
 Iranian architecture
 History of Persian domes

References

Sources

Persian Bulletin of Blue Mosque, Iranian Cultural Heritages Organization.

Further reading

External links 

 Blue Mosque of Tabriz official website 
 Blue Mosque (Kaboud Mosque) introduction in UNESCO web site
 Tishineh

Mosques completed in 1465
Mosques in Tabriz
Mosque buildings with domes
2nd-millennium establishments in Iran